Joshua Scott "JC" Chasez (born August 8, 1976) is an American singer, songwriter, dancer, record producer, and occasional actor. He started out his career as a cast member on The Mickey Mouse Club before rising to stardom with NSYNC, and by writing and producing for a wide variety of music acts such as Diplo, Girls Aloud, Sugababes, Basement Jaxx, David Archuleta, and Matthew Morrison. He also served as a judge for America's Best Dance Crew.

Early life
Chasez was born on August 8, 1976, in Bowie, Maryland. When he was five years old, his biological mother entrusted guardianship of her son to her own former foster parents Roy and Karen Chasez, who worked as a technology company consultant and an editor, respectively. He was adopted by the couple and raised Mennonite along with his younger siblings, Tyler and Heather. Chasez attended the former Robert Goddard Middle School and then Bowie High School.

Career
As a child, Chasez was extremely shy but very musical. After a friend bet him $20 to enter a talent contest, he discovered he enjoyed performing and later won a national dance competition at age 13. In 1989 his mother saw auditions for Disney's The Mickey Mouse Club advertised in The Washington Post and encouraged Chasez to try out. Chasez was cast in the fourth season, going by his initials as there was another cast member named Josh (Ackerman). He stayed on the show until its cancellation in 1994, during which time he befriended future bandmate Justin Timberlake and performed alongside Christina Aguilera, Britney Spears, Tony Lucca, Keri Russell, and Ryan Gosling.

NSYNC

Chasez and Justin Timberlake were the two lead singers of what would become the boy band NSYNC. The group was formed in 1995 by Chris Kirkpatrick and began recording and performing the following year in Europe. In 1998, the band released its debut album *NSYNC which sold 11 million copies, earning them popularity in the United States. After the band had a series of legal struggles with manager Lou Pearlman, they signed with Jive Records. They released their second studio album No Strings Attached in 2000, which became the fastest-selling album of all time, selling 2.4 million copies in the first week.  They held this record until 2015 when Adele surpassed the single-week sales record with her third album 25. Singles from the No Strings Attached album included "Bye Bye Bye", "This I Promise You", and the No. 1 hit "It's Gonna Be Me". The band produced their third studio album, Celebrity in 2001, which sold 1.8 million copies in the first week.

After their Celebrity Tour in 2002, NSYNC went on hiatus and though never formally disbanded, members have stated there no plans to reform or record new music. The group performed for the first time together again at the 2013 MTV Video Music Awards to mark Timberlake winning the Video Vanguard Award. In April 2019, Chasez and bandmates Lance Bass, Joey Fatone, and Chris Kirkpatrick performed with Ariana Grande as part of  headlining set at Coachella.

2002-2007: Solo Music

While still a member of NSYNC, Chasez appeared on the remix and album versions of the 1999 single "Bring It All to Me" by the girl group Blaque, though his vocals were credited to NSYNC as a whole. During the band's time Chasez became involved with songwriting and production for his group and other artists, including Wild Orchid.

During NSYNC's hiatus, Chasez continued to work as a songwriter and producer. Producer Dallas Austin asked Chasez to record the song "Blowin' Me Up (With Her Love)" for the Drumline soundtrack, which was later released as a single. Chasez subsequently began work on a solo album with Jive Records, with tracks written and produced by Austin, Basement Jaxx, Robb Boldt and Riprock 'n' Alex G as well as Chasez. After numerous delays, his debut album Schizophrenic was released in February 2004.  Promotion for the album was affected by former bandmate Justin Timberlake and Janet Jackson's Super Bowl XXXVIII halftime show controversy, after which Chasez was dropped from performing at half-time at the 2004 Pro Bowl. With the NFL unhappy with the lyrics of the single "Some Girls (Dance with Women)" expressing too much sexuality, Chasez agreed to alter his performance but was met with too much resistance from the organizers, who ultimately replaced Chasez's act with Hawaiian hula dancers.

At the same time, Chasez sang vocals on the Basement Jaxx track, "Plug It In", which reached number one in the UK Dance Charts. Following the release of Schizophrenic, Chasez began work on his second album, The Story of Kate. The album featured production from Chasez's former NSYNC bandmate Timberlake, Timbaland, Dallas Austin, Jimmy Harry, and Emanuel Kiriakou. Timberlake, who produced a few songs for the album, said, "In my opinion, (JC) had the best voice out of all of us...Out of all the boy bands, call 'em what you will, he was the one that could out-sing all of us. And I've known him since I was twelve, so it was fun to sit behind the board and push him."

Though originally slated for release in 2006, The Story of Kate was delayed to the following year. The two lead singles, "Until Yesterday" and "You Ruined Me" were released online. Chasez performed material from the new album during guests spots on TV shows Ghost Whisperer, Las Vegas, and Pussycat Dolls Present: Girlicious. After the album's release was further stalled, it was effectively cancelled when Chasez and Jive parted ways through mutual decision in September 2007.

2008-present: America's Best Dance Crew, songwriting 
Chasez continues to work as a songwriter and producer, with songs written for David Archuleta, Matthew Morrison and Backstreet Boys. He has written for Taemin, Liz, and NU’EST. In 2008 he became a judge on Randy Jackson's America's Best Dance Crew on MTV, serving on the panel for the first seven seasons of the show's original run.

In November 2010, the song "IF U C Kate" written by Dallas Austin, Taio Cruz, Alan Nglish, and Chasez was featured on the British band McFly's album, Above the Noise. Chasez wrote and produced two songs on AJ McLean's debut album Have It All, released in the US in February 2011. 

In February 2012 Chasez and producer Jimmy Harry held auditions for an all-girl group which was formed in November the same year under the name Girl Radical. Girl Radical was an eleven-member pop musical act inspired by large Asian pop supergroups. 

In 2014, Chasez was selected to join the North American tour of Andrew Lloyd Webber's rock opera Jesus Christ Superstar as Pontius Pilate. Other cast members included Superstar winner Ben Forster and other well-known artists, including Incubus' Brandon Boyd, Destiny's Child's Michelle Williams, and Public Image Ltd's John Lydon. However, on May 30, 2014, the entire North American tour was abruptly canceled, with poor projected ticket sales cited as the reason.

Along with Miguel and Aloe Blacc, Chasez was featured on a new version of "My Girl" with Smokey Robinson on the album Smokey & Friends. In 2015, Chasez appeared, along with 3OH!3, on the title track of the Blues Traveler album Blow Up the Moon, and on the song's accompanying music video. In 2016, Chasez starred in the film Opening Night, in which he played a dramatized version of himself.

In January 2023, Chasez appeared as a guest on former bandmate Lance Bass' Frosted Tips podcast, and revealed he is currently working on a musical.

Discography

 Schizophrenic (2004)
Story of Kate (2007, unreleased)

Filmography

Award nominations

References

External links

1976 births
Living people
20th-century American singers
21st-century American singers
American adoptees
American child singers
American contemporary R&B singers
American dance musicians
American house musicians
American male singer-songwriters
American Mennonites
American male child actors
American male pop singers
American male film actors
American male dancers
American male television actors
American tenors
Child pop musicians
Dance-pop musicians
Male actors from Maryland
Mouseketeers
Singers with a three-octave vocal range
Record producers from Maryland
Jive Records artists
Singer-songwriters from Maryland
NSYNC members
People from Bowie, Maryland
Sony BMG artists
Singer-songwriters from Washington, D.C.
Mennonite musicians